Municipal elections were held in Costa Rica on 5 December 2010. Were the third municipal elections in the history of the country and the last on be held in December of the same electoral year due to an electoral reform that turned municipal election to be held mid-term. Because of this the Electoral Supreme Court mandate the constitutional period of the newly elected authorities to last for 6 years for one unique time. The election was for mayors of the 81 cantons, syndics and district councilors for all the country's districts and 8 Intendants for 8 especial autonomous districts.

Then ruling National Liberation Party was victorious retaining all but one of the mayorships it held before and 6 of the 7 provincial capitals (all except Liberia). The historical Social Christian Unity Party was the second largest municipal force as before and main opposition party Citizens' Action Party was the third largest unable to repeat its general success in presidential and legislative vote (been the second largest in both in the latest election). The liberal Libertarian Movement and the conservative Accessibility without Exclusion achieve 2 mayors each. While other two mayors came from two local forces in Curridabat and Escazu and one only mayor was elected for the religious Christian party Costa Rican Renewal.

Results

Mayor

By province

Municipal councils, syndics, district councils

See also 
 Local government in Costa Rica
 List of mayors in Costa Rica

References

2010 elections in Central America
2010 in Costa Rica
Local elections in Costa Rica